The World Council of Fisheries Societies is a non-profit, non-governmental organisation intended to promote international cooperation in fisheries science, conservation and management. The Council consists of 10 member organisations, and arose from the 1st World Fisheries Congress in Athens, Greece in 1992.

Membership
The Council currently comprises 10 member organisations:
 American Fisheries Society
 Australian Society for Fish Biology
 Canadian Aquatic Resources Section
 Fisheries Society of the British Isles
 Indian Society of Fisheries Professionals
 Japanese Society of Fisheries Science
 Korean Society of Fisheries and Aquatic Sciences
 Mexican Fisheries Society
 World Sturgeon Conservation Society
 Zoological Society of Pakistan

World Fisheries Congress
Every four years, the World Council of Fisheries Societies runs an international conference event called the World Fisheries Congress.

Notes

References

External links
 

Professional associations based in the United States
Biology societies
Ecology organizations
Fisheries organizations